Cala Tuent is on Majorca, Spain's largest island, located in the Mediterranean Sea and part of the Balearic Islands archipelago.

The beach has a length of 180 meters, the middle width amounts to 55 meters. Flints, stones and small sand surfaces alternate. By the elongated water surface of the sea cut a moderate undulation exists within the bay. The water quality is excellent. Outside of the marked swimming surface there are colder, partially strong currents. The bay is not supervised by rescue floats. Boat traffic is minimal. There are some few houses located on the relatively steep hillsides enclosing the bay. The hills are mostly overgrown with pine trees where olive trees are located behind the beach.

Populated places in Mallorca
Beaches of Mallorca
Beaches of the Balearic Islands